"Sangagiri Railway Station" (officially named by British Raj government as Sankari Durg railway station (SGE)  is a station, 3.5 kms south of Sangagiri town of Tamil Nadu, India.

References

Salem railway division
Railway stations in Salem district